Broad Mountain may refer to:

 Broad Mountain (Lehigh Valley), a barrier ridge in Carbon County and Schuylkill County, Pennsylvania, U.S.
 Broad Mountain in Grundy County, Tennessee, U.S.
 Broad Mountain in Kerr County, Texas, U.S.